Adhkatiya Kala Khas  (also known as Adhikariya Kala) is a village in Pindra Tehsil of Varanasi district in the Indian state of Uttar Pradesh. Adhkatiya Kala Khas falls under the Tilvar gram panchayat. The village is about 34 kilometers North-West of Varanasi city, 280 kilometers South-East of state capital Lucknow and 783 kilometers South-East of the national capital Delhi.

Demography
Adhkatiya Kala Khas has a total population of 67 people amongst 7 families. Sex ratio of Adhkatiya Kala Khas is 763 and child sex ratio is 400. Uttar Pradesh state average for both ratios is 912 and 902 respectively.

Transportation
Adhkatiya Kala Khas can be accessed by road and does not have a railway station of its own. Closest railway station to this village is Babatpur Railway Station ( east). Nearest operational airports are Varanasi airport ( east) and Allahabad Airports ( west).

See also

Pindra Tehsil
Varanasi district

Notes
  All demographic data is based on 2011 Census of India.

References 

Villages in Varanasi district